Cabinet of Jiří Rusnok was a Cabinet of the Czech Republic. It was appointed by the President of the Czech Republic Miloš Zeman on 10 July 2013; however, on 7 August, it did not win enough support, losing a confidence vote by 93 to 100. Some parties called for immediate dissolution, leading eventually to elections which took place in October. Rusnok's cabinet then continued in a caretaker capacity. It left the office on 29 January 2014.

Government ministers

References 

Zeman jmenoval Rusnokovu vládu. Čeká, že zabrání tlakům na policii (iDnes.cz)

Czech government cabinets
KDU-ČSL